Eupithecia insigniata, the pinion-spotted pug,  is a moth of the family Geometridae. The species can be found in Europe and Turkey.

The wingspan is 18–22 mm. The moths flies from April to May depending on the location.

The larvae feed on Crataegus and Malus species.

Subspecies
Eupithecia insigniata insigniata
Eupithecia insigniata insignioides Wehrli, 1923

References

External links
Pinion-spotted pug on UKmoths
Lepiforum.de

Moths described in 1790
insigniata
Moths of Europe
Moths of Asia
Taxa named by Jacob Hübner